Bellville mainline railway station is a railway station in the town of Bellville, Western Cape, South Africa. It is the second-biggest station in the Metrorail Western Cape railway network, after the Cape Town terminus. All trains on Metrorail's Northern Line pass through Bellville, and one branch of the Central Line also terminates there. It is also a stop for Shosholoza Meyl trains that terminate in Cape Town.

Bellville Station is a major terminus for Golden Arrow buses; it also has a large minibus taxi rank. To the south of the station is Transnet Freight Rail's main marshalling yard for the Cape Town area.

The station building is on the northern side of the tracks, attached to a side platform. There are four island platforms and an island containing two bays for trains traveling to and from Cape Town. The platforms are linked by two pedestrian tunnels.

Notable places nearby
 Bellville Civic Centre
 Bellville Sports Ground
 Northlink College Protea campus
 Tygerberg Medical Campus

Services

Railway stations in Cape Town
Shosholoza Meyl stations
Metrorail Western Cape stations